Øvre Bardu Chapel is a chapel of the Church of Norway in Bardu Municipality in Troms og Finnmark county, Norway. It is located along the Sørdalselva river in the Sørdalen valley in eastern Bardu. It is an annex chapel for the Bardu parish which is part of the Senja prosti (deanery) in the Diocese of Nord-Hålogaland. The white, wooden church was built in a long church style in 1971 using plans drawn up by the architect Petter Bratli. The church seats about 200 people.

See also
List of churches in Nord-Hålogaland

References

Bardu
Churches in Troms
Wooden churches in Norway
20th-century Church of Norway church buildings
Churches completed in 1971
1971 establishments in Norway
Long churches in Norway